2016 World Series may refer to:

 2016 Major League Baseball World Series
 2016 Little League World Series (baseball)
 2016 Intermediate League World Series (baseball)
 2016 Junior League World Series (baseball)
 2016 Senior League World Series (baseball)
 2016 Big League World Series (baseball)
 2016 College World Series (baseball)
 2016 World Club Series (rugby league)
 2016 World Series of Boxing
 2016 World Series of Poker
 2016 Fast5 Netball World Series
 2016 PSA World Series (men's squash)
 2015–16 America's Cup World Series (sailing)